The West Texas Rufneks were a professional American football team based in Midland, Texas. They began play as the Odessa-Midland Comets in the Texas Football League in 1966. In September 1968 the franchise was purchased by Dallas investor Alton Fairchild, who changed the team's name to the West Texas Rufneks. When the Texas Football League merged with the Continental Football League for its 1969 season, the Rufneks became a member of the COFL's new Texas Division East. The team announced plans to relocate after the 1969 season, but the move never happened and the Rufneks dissolved before the 1970 Texas Football League season.

Season-by-season

References

Continental Football League teams
Defunct American football teams in Texas
Sports in Midland, Texas
American football teams established in 1966
Sports clubs disestablished in 1970
1966 establishments in Texas
1970 disestablishments in Texas